Alan Gilbert is the John Evans Professor at the Josef Korbel School of International Studies at the University of Denver and operator of the web site "Democratic Individuality." He was a member of the Harvard chapter of Students for a Democratic Society at the time of the occupation of University Hall at Harvard in 1969.

Education
PhD, Harvard University
MSc, London School of Economics
BA, Harvard College

Works

References

Living people
University of Denver faculty
Alumni of the London School of Economics
Harvard College alumni
American Book Award winners
Year of birth missing (living people)